Dragnet Patrol is a 1931 American Pre-Code melodrama film directed by Frank R. Strayer from a script by W. Scott Darling. The film stars Glenn Tryon, Vera Reynolds, and Marjorie Beebe, and was released by Action Pictures on December 15, 1931.

Cast list
 Glenn Tryon as Larry
 Vera Reynolds as Millie
 Marjorie Beebe as Mabel
 Vernon Dent as Cookie
 Symona Boniface as Ethel
 Walter Long as Grainger
 George Hayes as Private detective

References

External links
 
 
 

Melodrama films
1931 drama films
1931 films
American drama films
Films directed by Frank R. Strayer
American black-and-white films
Mayfair Pictures films
1930s English-language films
1930s American films